Kuntur Qaqa (Quechua kuntur condor, qaqa rock, "condor rock", hispanicized spelling Condorgaga) is a mountain in the Cordillera Negra in the Andes of Peru, about  high. It is situated in the Ancash Region, Recuay Province, Marca District.

References 

Mountains of Peru
Mountains of Ancash Region